Abpuneh (also Romanized as Ābpūneh; also known as Āb-i-Pina and Āb Pā’in) is a village in Rezvaniyeh Rural District, in the Central District of Tiran and Karvan County, Isfahan Province, Iran. At the 2006 census, its population was 534, in 153 families.

References 

Populated places in Tiran and Karvan County